Ammapalayam is a panchayat village in Gobichettipalayam taluk in Erode District of Tamil Nadu state, India. It is about 15 km from Gobichettipalayam and 37 km from district headquarters Erode. The village is located on the road connecting Gobichettipalayam with Bhavani via Mevani. Ammapalayam has a population of about 1102.

References

Villages in Erode district